C. parallelus may refer to:
 Chalcides parallelus, the Doumergue's skink, a skink species found in Algeria, Morocco and Spain
 Chomatodus parallelus, a prehistoric fish species
 Chorthippus parallelus, the meadow grasshopper,  a grasshopper species found in Europe and some adjoining areas of Asia